Scott Griffin is an American musician who is best known as a former bassist for L.A. Guns and Ratt. In 2007, Griffin was announced as the bassist for L.A. Guns, having previously played in Dizzy Reed's cover band Hookers N' Blow, replacing Adam Hamilton. From 2015 until April 1, 2016, Griffin was the bassist of a revamped version of Ratt, led by drummer Bobby Blotzer.

After one of Griffin's side-projects, The King Mixers, were offered a residency in Las Vegas in 2009, he left the group and was replaced by former Beautiful Creatures bassist Kenny Kweens. In 2011, he re-joined L.A. Guns, but departed the group once again in September 2014.

References

External links

L.A. Guns members
Place of birth missing (living people)
Year of birth missing (living people)
American heavy metal bass guitarists
American male bass guitarists
Living people
BulletBoys members
Sin City Sinners members